Futbolen kompleks Botev 1912 is a football complex in the Komatevo neighbourhood of Plovdiv, Bulgaria, which is the temporary home of Botev Plovdiv and its youth academy.

The first squad has been using the venue for their training and official matches since late 2013, because their official stadium, the Hristo Botev Stadium is being reconstructed. From the summer of 2014 the redevelopment is on hold, due to the lack of funding.

In 2017, the football complex was leased to Maritsa Plovdiv, until their stadium was licensed for professional football matches.

Overview
The surface of the remaining four terrains is made from grass. A stand with a seating capacity of 1,998 spectators is situated next to one of the fields. The stand consists of two levels. The first one contains two built-in changing rooms, a gym, training rooms, referee rooms, a storage room, a doctor's office, a massage room and a press conferences room. The second level contains a fanshop and a cafeteria. The venue also consists of a hotel part.

Renovations

2016
In order to meet the licensing criteria of the Bulgarian Football Union, the club bought four floodlight pylons, which were then situated around the official field.

References

External links

Botev Plovdiv
Sports venues in Plovdiv
Football venues in Bulgaria